The King is a 2017 South Korean political crime drama film starring Jo In-sung, Jung Woo-sung, Bae Seong-woo, Ryu Jun-yeol, Kim Eui-sung, and Kim Ah-joong.

Synopsis
Story about Tae-soo (Jo In-sung) who's born in a poor family, decides to become a prosecutor after learning that power is the most important thing in life and, the biggest symbol of power in the 90’s. After entering the most prestigious law school, experiencing democratic resistance in Korea, Tae-soo finally reaches his goal of becoming a prosecutor but his life is no better than a salary man. By chance, he joins a clique of the powerful prosecutors with wealth and authority. He finally gets a taste of a life of the top hierarchy, but as he enjoys the sweetness of supremacy, he also sees the cruel side of it.

Cast

Jo In-sung as Park Tae-soo 
Jung Woo-sung as Han Kang-shik 
Bae Seong-woo as Yang Dong-chul 
Ryu Jun-yeol as Choi Doo-il  
Kim Eui-sung as Kim Eung-soo 
Kim Ah-joong as Sang-hee 
Jang Myung-gab as Um Hyun-gi 
Jung Eun-chae as Park Shi-yeon
Kim So-jin as Ahn Hee-yeon
Hwang Seung-eon as Jun Hee-sung
Shin Ryu-jin as Ji Min
Sung Dong-il as Tae-soo's home room teacher	
Jung Sung-mo 
Lee Joo-yeon
Cha Yeob 
Park Jung-min 
Jung Da-un 
Lee Yeol-eum 
Choi Gwi-hwa 
Oh Dae-hwan 
Han Soo-yeon 
Lim Hak-sun 
Seo Wang-seok 
Lee Kyu-ho 
Choi Yeong-do 
Mi Seok 
Lee Ho-cheol 
Kim Koo-kyung 
Park Ji-hong
 Jo Woo-jin as Park Tae-soo's detective

Production
First script reading took place in late January, 2016. Filming began on February 4 and finished July 3, 2016. Filming took place in Seoul, Daejeon and Busan in South Korea.

Promotion and release
The film's first trailer has broken the record for most views for a Korean movie trailer with more than 7.17 million views in seven days within its release.

The film was released in South Korea on January 18, 2017. The film had a limited release in North America on January 27, 2017.

Reception
In total, the film gathered 5.31 million spectators and grossed  nationwide, making it the 7th highest-grossing South Korean film in 2017.

Awards and nominations

References

External links 
 The King on Naver Movies
 The King on Daum
 The King on MOVIST

2017 films
2010s Korean-language films
South Korean action drama films
South Korean crime drama films
South Korean political drama films
Next Entertainment World films
2017 crime drama films
South Korean crime action films
Political action films
Films directed by Han Jae-rim
2010s South Korean films